William Rowe (1819–1886) was a 19th-century Member of Parliament in the Auckland Region, New Zealand. 

He represented the Thames electorate from 1876 to 1879 when he retired.

In 1876 he polled second in Thames to Sir George Grey, who had also stood for the Auckland West electorate. A committee decided that Grey was validly elected for Thames as well as Auckland West, but that Grey had to decide which electorate he wished to represent. Grey had originally chosen Auckland West, but then decided that he wished to represent Thames and asked that a by-election be held in Auckland West for the vacated seat.

References

1819 births
1886 deaths
Members of the New Zealand House of Representatives
New Zealand MPs for North Island electorates
19th-century New Zealand politicians